Frank W. Hackett (April 11, 1841 – August 10, 1926) was a civilian administrator and lawyer who served as an Assistant Secretary of the Navy under President William McKinley.  During the American Civil War, he was an assistant paymaster serving the Atlantic Fleet. Hackett was on board  during its skirmish against . After the war, he passed the bar exam and eventually opened a law office in Washington, D.C.  From April 1900 to December 1901, Hackett served as Assistant Secretary of the Navy.

References

External links
 

1841 births
1926 deaths
Paymasters
Union Navy sailors
United States Assistant Secretaries of the Navy
Lawyers from Washington, D.C.
19th-century American lawyers